The Riyadh International Convention and Exhibition Center is a convention center in Riyadh, Saudi Arabia.

History
The convention center was opened in March 2009. During the COVID-19 pandemic, the center is turned into the vaccination center.

References

External links
 

2009 establishments in Saudi Arabia
Buildings and structures in Riyadh
Convention centers in Saudi Arabia
Event venues established in 2009